Midstream is a 1929 American science fiction film directed by James Flood and starring Ricardo Cortez, Claire Windsor and Montagu Love. A part-talkie with sound sequences, Once believed to be a lost film, one reel featuring a performance of the opera Faust was located in 2003 and included as an extra on the 2 DVD set of The Phantom of the Opera (1925), released by the Milestone Collection.

Cast
 Ricardo Cortez as James Stanwood 
 Claire Windsor as Helene Craig 
 Montagu Love as Dr. Nelson 
 Larry Kent as Martin Baker 
 Helen Jerome Eddy as Mary Mason 
 Leslie Brigham as Mephistopheles
 Genevieve Schrader as Marguerite
 Louis Alvarez as Faust
 Florence Foyer as Marthe

See also
 List of Incomplete or Partially Lost Films

References

Bibliography
 Pitts, Michael R. Poverty Row Studios, 1929–1940: An Illustrated History of 55 Independent Film Companies, with a Filmography for Each. McFarland & Company, 2005.

External links
 

1929 films
1920s science fiction films
1920s English-language films
American science fiction films
Films directed by James Flood
Tiffany Pictures films
Lost American films
American black-and-white films
1929 lost films
Lost science fiction films
1920s American films
Silent science fiction films